Bobrowice may refer to:

Bobrowice, Krosno Odrzańskie County in Lubusz Voivodeship (west Poland)
Bobrowice, Żagań County in Lubusz Voivodeship (west Poland)
Bobrowice, West Pomeranian Voivodeship (north-west Poland)
Gmina Bobrowice